Gedevanishvili is a Georgian surname. Notable people with the surname include:

 Dimitri Gedevanishvili (born 1993), Georgian alpine skier
 Elene Gedevanishvili (born 1990), Georgian figure skater

Georgian-language surnames